Harrisonburg High School may refer to:

Harrisonburg High School (Louisiana) in Harrisonburg, Louisiana
Harrisonburg High School (Virginia) in Harrisonburg, Virginia